Elections to city, county, and district people's assemblies were held in North Korea on March 6, 1983. In total, 24,562 city, county and district people's assembly deputies were elected.

Voter turnout was reported as 100%, with candidates receiving a 100% approval rate.

References

Local elections
North Korea
Local elections in North Korea
North Korean local elections